You Walk Alone is the sixteenth album by Jandek, and the first of two released in 1988. It is Corwood Industries (#0754), and is the first album by the "blues rock" band that followed the apparent meltdown of the original "garage rock" band.

Track listing

References

External links
Seth Tisue's You Walk Alone review

1988 albums
Corwood Industries albums
Jandek albums